Dogme 95 is a 1995 avant-garde filmmaking movement founded by the Danish directors Lars von Trier and Thomas Vinterberg, who created the "Dogme 95 Manifesto" and the "Vows of Chastity". These were rules to create films based on the traditional values of story, acting, and theme, and excluding the use of elaborate special effects or technology. It was supposedly created as an attempt to "take back power for the directors as artists", as opposed to the studio. They were later joined by fellow Danish directors Kristian Levring and Søren Kragh-Jacobsen, forming the Dogme 95 Collective or the Dogme Brethren. Dogme is the Danish word for dogma.

History

Lars von Trier and Thomas Vinterberg wrote and co-signed the manifesto and its companion "vows". Vinterberg said that they wrote the pieces in 45 minutes. The manifesto initially mimics the wording of François Truffaut's 1954 essay "Une certaine tendance du cinéma français" in Cahiers du cinéma.

They announced the Dogme movement on March 13, 1995, in Paris, at Le cinéma vers son deuxième siècle conference. The cinema world had gathered to celebrate the first century of motion pictures and contemplate the uncertain future of commercial cinema. Called upon to speak about the future of film, Lars von Trier showered a bemused audience with red pamphlets announcing "Dogme 95".

In response to criticism, von Trier and Vinterberg have both stated that they just wanted to establish a new extreme: "In a business of extremely high budgets, we figured we should balance the dynamic as much as possible."

Like the No Wave Cinema creative movement, Dogme 95 has been described as a defining period in low budget film production.

Since 2002 and the 31st film, Spanish director Juan Pinzás is no longer needs to have their work verified by the original board to identify it as a Dogme 95 work after finishing up his own trilogy. The founding "brothers" have begun working on new experimental projects and have been skeptical about the later common interpretation of the Manifesto as a brand or a genre. The movement broke up in 2005.

Since the late 2000s, the emergence of video technology in DSLR photography cameras, such as the Canon EOS 550D, has resulted in a tremendous surge of both feature and short films shot with most, if not all, of the rules pertaining to the Dogme 95 manifesto. However, because of advancements in technology and quality, the aesthetic of these productions typically appears drastically different from that of the Dogme films shot on Tape or DVD-R Camcorders. Largely erasing the primitive and problematic features of past technologies, newer technologies have helped Dogme 95 filmmakers achieve an aesthetic of higher resolution, as well as of lower contrast, film grain, and saturation.

Goals and rules
The goal of the Dogme collective is to "purify" filmmaking by refusing expensive and spectacular special effects, post-production modifications and other technical gimmicks. The filmmakers concentrate on the story and the actors' performances. They claim this approach may better engage the audience, as they are not "alienated or distracted by overproduction". To this end, von Trier and Vinterberg produced ten rules to which any Dogme film must conform. These rules, referred to as the "Vow of Chastity", are as follows:

 Shooting must be done on location. Props and sets must not be brought in (if a particular prop is necessary for the story, a location must be chosen where this prop is to be found).
 The sound must never be produced apart from the images or vice versa. (Music must not be used unless it occurs where the scene is being shot.)
 The camera must be hand-held. Any movement or immobility attainable in the hand is permitted.
 The film must be in colour. Special lighting is not acceptable. (If there is too little light for exposure the scene must be cut or a single lamp be attached to the camera.)
 Optical work and filters are forbidden.
 The film must not contain superficial action. (Murders, weapons, etc. must not occur.)
 Temporal and geographical alienation are forbidden. (That is to say that the film takes place here and now.)
 Genre movies are not acceptable.
 The film format must be Academy 35 mm.
 The director must not be credited.

″Furthermore I swear as a director to refrain from personal taste! I am no longer an artist. I swear to refrain from creating a “work”, as I regard the instant as more important than the whole. My supreme goal is to force the truth out of my characters and settings. I swear to do so by all the means available and at the cost of any good taste and any aesthetic considerations.

Thus I make my VOW OF CHASTITY.″

Firsts 
In total, thirty-five films made between 1998 and 2005 are considered to be part of the movement. 

 The first of the Dogme films (Dogme #1) was Vinterberg's 1998 film Festen (The Celebration), first produced in Denmark.
 Since the first four films from Denmark were released, other international directors have made films based on Dogme principles. French-American actor and director Jean-Marc Barr, a von Trier's frequent collaborator, was the first non-Dane to direct a Dogme film: Lovers (1999) (Dogme #5).
 American director Harmony Korine's film Julien Donkey-Boy (Dogme #6) is also a first non-European and the first American film to be considered a Dogme.
 South Korean's La Femis-graduate and academic Daniel H. Byun, who directs his film debut Interview (Dogme #7), being the first and only Asian film ever made under the Dogme movement.
 Argentine filmmaker José Luis Marquès' mockumentary film Fuckland (Dogme #8), is the first Latin American and the first Argentina film to follow the Dogme 95 movement minimalist guidelines.
 Von Trier attempted to make into a Dogme trilogy as "Golden Heart" (consists Breaking the Waves (1996), The Idiots (1998; Dogme #2), and Dancer in the Dark (2000)), but only The Idiots is a certified Dogme 95 film while Breaking the Waves and Dancer in the Dark are sometimes associated or heavily laid out with the movement. As a result, Pinzás was the only filmmaker to submitted three films, consists into a trilogy as "Gay Galician Dogma", which directs Once Upon Another Time (2000; Dogme #22), Wedding Days (2002; Dogme #30), and The Outcome (2005; Dogme #31)

Attempts 
Although Interview (2000) does not explicitly mention that it is registered as Dogma #7, it refers to a scheduled German film titled Broken Cookies, directed by another von Trier's frequent collaborator Udo Kier, for officially submitting the manifesto as the seventh Dogme, but the film's production was never realized or suspended before ended up submitted by Byun's Korean film.

The end credits of Het Zuiden (South) (2004), directed by Martin Koolhoven, included thanks to "Dogme 95". Koolhoven originally planned to shoot it as a Dogme film, and it was co-produced by von Trier's Zentropa. Finally, the director decided he did not want to be so severely constrained as by Dogme principles.

Uses and abuses 
The above rules have been both circumvented and broken from numerous films submitted as a Dogme, particularly a director's credit and background music appearing in Interview and Fuckland as for examples. Some films include;

 For instance from the first Dogme film to be produced, Vinterberg "confessed" to having covered a window during the shooting of one scene in The Celebration (Festen). With this, he both brought a prop onto the set and used "special lighting".
 Von Trier used background music (Le Cygne by Camille Saint-Saëns) in the film The Idiots (Idioterne).
 Korine's Julien Donkey-Boy features two scenes with non-diegetic music, several shot with non-handheld, hidden cameras and a non-diegetic prop.
 Byun's Interview also features that violated the rules including cramming in dolly shots, moody lighting, a director's credit, and Park's background music.
 Márques' Fuckland broke some of the Dogme 95 guidelines, including the use of non-diegetic music, digital video, and a directorial credit.

Concepts and influences 
In Von Trier's first film of "Golden Heart" trilogy, Breaking the Waves, after founding the Dogme 95 movement with Vinterberg in 1995, heavily influenced by the movement's style and ethos, despite it breaks many of the movement's "rules", including a directorial credit, background sets, non-diegetic music, and use of CGI.

The 2001 experimental film Hotel, directed by Mike Figgis, makes several mentions of the Dogme 95 style of filmmaking, and has been described as a "Dogme film-within-a-film".

Keyboard player and music producer Money Mark used principles inspired by Dogme 95 to record his Mark's Keyboard Repair album.

Notable Dogme films

A complete list of the 35 films is available from the Dogme95 web site. Juan Pinzás (#22, #30, and #31) is the only filmmaker to have submitted more than once.

 Dogme #1: Festen
 Dogme #2: The Idiots
 Dogme #3: Mifune's Last Song
 Dogme #4: The King Is Alive
 Dogme #5: Lovers
 Dogme #6: Julien Donkey-Boy
 Dogme #7: Interview
 Dogme #8: Fuckland
 Dogme #12: Italian for Beginners
 Dogme #13: Amerikana
 Dogme #14: Joy Ride
 Dogme #28: Open Hearts

Reception 

Most of the Dogme films received mixed or negative reviews, though some were critically acclaimed such as Vinterberg's film Festen (The Celebration), Scherfig's film Italiensk for begyndere (Italian for Beginners), and Bier's film Elsker dig for evigt (Open Hearts). Films such as Von Trier's film Idioterne (The Idiots) and Jacobsen's film Mifunes sidste sang (Mifune's Last Song), also received lukewarm reviews.

Festen won numerous awards including the Jury Prize at the Cannes Film Festival and won seven at Robert Awards in 1998. Italiensk for begyndere also won the Silver Bear Grand Jury Prize at the Berlin Film Festival in 2000.

In 2015, the Museum of Arts and Design celebrated the movement with the retrospective The Director Must Not Be Credited: 20 Years of Dogme 95. The retrospective included work by Lars von Trier, Thomas Vinterberg, Jean-Marc Barr, Susanne Bier, Daniel H. Byun, Harmony Korine, Kristian Levring, Annette K. Olesen, and Lone Scherfig.

Notable directors and actors/actresses appeared in films

 Miles Anderson
 Jean-Marc Barr
 Susanne Bier
 David Bradley
 Daniel H. Byun
 Søren Kragh-Jacobsen
 Lee Jung-jae
 Harmony Korine
 Jennifer Jason Leigh
 Kristian Levring
 Mads Mikkelsen
 Anthony Dod Mantle
 Richard Martini
 Lone Scherfig
 Chloë Sevigny
 Paprika Steen
 Thomas Vinterberg
 Lars von Trier

Legacy 
Although the movement was dissolved in 2005, the filmmakers continued to develop independent and experimental films using or influenced the concept including Jan Dunn's Gypo and Brillante Mendoza's films Serbis, Tirador, and Ma' Rosa.

The use of 'Dogme 95' style filming is in a list of a hostage taker's demands in the Black Mirror episode, "The National Anthem".

After the release of Byun's film Interview (2000), some South Korean films who considered as an influence to Dogme 95 films, but rejected that serves as an actual Dogme; this includes This Charming Girl (2004) by Lee Yoon-Ki, Secret Sunshine (2007) by Lee Chang-dong, and The Housemaid (2010) by Im Sang-soo.

Much of Von Trier's works were influenced by the manifesto. His first film after founding the movement was Breaking the Waves, which was heavily influenced by the movement's style and ethos, although the film broke many of the "rules" laid out by the movement's manifesto, including built sets, and usage of non-diegetic musics and computer graphics. Most of his films since the 1998 film Idioterne until Riget: Exodus.

Vinterberg's 2012 film, Jagten, was also influenced by the manifesto.

Money Mark has stated that the album Mark's Keyboard Repair was an "experimental concept based loosely on" the Dogme 95 idea.

See also
 :Category:Dogme 95 films
 Minimalism
 Realism (arts)
 Pluginmanifesto
 New Puritans
 Stuckism
 New Sincerity
 Remodernism
 Remodernist film
 Post-postmodernism

Notes and references

External links 
 "Interview: Mogens Rukov", Zakka
 "Lars From 1-10", 10-minute film with reflections by von Trier on Dogme 95, The Perverts Guide
 
 Inside Cinema - Dogma 95

Cinema of Denmark
Danish culture
Film and video terminology
Lars von Trier
Movements in cinema
1990s in film
2000s in film